Bailly Lake is a body of freshwater in the north-eastern part of Senneterre in the Vallée-de-l'Or Regional County Municipality (RCM), in the administrative region of Abitibi-Témiscamingue, in the province of Quebec, in Canada.

Lake Bailly is crossed to the South Saint-Cyr River South. Lake Bailly is located entirely in the canton of Bailly. Forestry is the main economic activity of the sector. Recreational tourism activities come second.

The hydrographic slope of Lake Bailly is accessible via a forest road (North-South direction) on the east side of the Saint-Cyr River South Valley; in addition, another forest road (East-West direction) serves the northern part of the Bailly Lake Biodiversity Reserve and connects R1015 to the west.

The surface of Bailly Lake is usually frozen from early November to mid-May, however, safe ice circulation is generally from mid-November to mid-April.

Geography

Toponymy
In this sector, the term "Bailly" is associated with the township and the lake.

The toponym "Lac Bailly" was formalized on December 5, 1968, by the Commission de toponymie du Québec, when it was created.

Notes and references

See also 

Lakes of Abitibi-Témiscamingue
La Vallée-de-l’Or
Nottaway River drainage basin